Seán Quinn (1929 – 27 January 1986) was an Irish Gaelic footballer who played for the Sarsfields and Seán McDermotts clubs and at senior level for the Armagh county team.

Career
Born in Lurgan, County Armagh, Quinn first came to prominence at club level with Sarsfields. He eventually earned a call-up to the Armagh senior football team and claimed Ulster Championship medals in 1950 and 1953. Quinn was captain for the second of those wins and subsequently lead the team to an All-Ireland final defeat by Kerry. He also played with the Seán McDermotts club in Dublin, while his inclusion on the Ulster team saw him claim a Railway Cup medal. Quinn was named on a "Football Team of the Century" made up of players who never won an All-Ireland medal.

Personal life and death
Quinn worked as a carpenter and was also a member of the Irish Army. He died from cancer at St. Luke's Hospital in Rathgar on 27 January 1986.

Honours
Armagh
Ulster Senior Football Championship: 1950, 1953

Ulster
Railway Cup: 1950

References

 

1929 births
1986 deaths
Armagh inter-county Gaelic footballers
Ulster inter-provincial Gaelic footballers